The name Sarika has been used to name three tropical cyclones in the northwestern Pacific Ocean. The name was submitted by Cambodia, meaning a songbird.
 Severe Tropical Storm Sarika (2004) (T0419, 23W)
 Tropical Storm Sarika (2011) (T1103, 05W, Dodong) – affected the Philippines during early-June.
 Typhoon Sarika (2016) (T1621, 24W, Karen) – Made landfall in the Philippines as a category 4 typhoon in mid-October.

The name Sarika was retired after the 2016 typhoon season and was replaced with Trases, which means a woodpecker.

Pacific typhoon set index articles